Exorcising Hitler: The Occupation and Denazification of Germany is a 2011 book written by Frederick Taylor.

References

2011 non-fiction books
History books about Nazi Germany
Bloomsbury Publishing books